Julião Murilo Ferreira (born 10 March 1989), is a Brazilian born, Italian futsal player who plays for Acqua e Sapone and the Italian national futsal team.

References

External links
UEFA profile

Italian men's futsal players
1989 births
Living people
Brazilian emigrants to Italy